Vanimo Airport is an airport in Vanimo, Papua New Guinea .

Airlines and destinations

Airports in Papua New Guinea
Sandaun Province